The Dova DV-1 Skylark is a Czech ultralight and light-sport aircraft produced by Dova Aircraft of Paskov. The aircraft is supplied as a kit for amateur construction or as a complete ready-to-fly-aircraft.

Design and development

The DV-1 was designed to comply with the Fédération Aéronautique Internationale microlight rules and US light-sport aircraft rules. It features a cantilever low-wing, a T-tail, a two-seats-in-side-by-side configuration enclosed cockpit under a bubble canopy, fixed tricycle landing gear with wheel pants and a single engine in tractor configuration.

The aircraft is made from aluminum sheet. Standard engines available are the  Rotax 912UL,  Rotax 912ULS,  turbocharged Rotax 914 and the BMW 1100 four-stroke powerplants.

The design is an accepted Federal Aviation Administration special light-sport aircraft.

Operational history
By February 2017 seven examples had been registered in the United States with the Federal Aviation Administration.

Variants
DV-1 Skylark
Model with a T-tail and winglets.
DV-2 Infinity
Model with a cruciform tail and no winglets. It is almost  faster than the DV-1.

Specifications (DV-1 Skylark)

References

External links

2000s Czech ultralight aircraft
Homebuilt aircraft
Light-sport aircraft
Single-engined tractor aircraft
T-tail aircraft